Tupele Dorgu (born 13 December 1977 in Preston, Lancashire) is an English actress and voice over artist. She is best known for playing the role of Kelly Crabtree in the ITV soap opera Coronation Street from 2004 to 2010.

Education
Dorgu was educated in and around the Preston area; she attended St Clare's Primary School, Our Lady's High School and latterly at Kirkham Grammar School. Her mother is of Irish and English descent and her father is from Nigeria.

Career
Dorgu has also appeared in Merseybeat, Loose Women, Casualty (2004), Doctors and Strictly African Dancing.

Dorgu has performed in many musicals including La Cage Aux Folles, Three Minute Heroes, and the West End production of Mamma Mia!.

Dorgu left her role as Kelly Crabtree in Coronation Street in March 2010.

In winter 2010, Dorgu starred as the Sorceress in the pantomime Robin Hood at the Theatre Royal in Newcastle from 30 November until 15 January 2011. In mid-2011, she made a brief appearance on the BBC's Waterloo Road as newcomer Keeley James.

Dorgu starred as Velma Kelly in the 2012 UK tour of Chicago.

In June 2013, Dorgu became the narrator of Brendan's Magical Mystery Tour, a show similar to Coach Trip on Channel 4.

Dorgu was announced to be joining the cast of Hollyoaks on 12 December 2015 as new doctor, Dr Berrington, in a recurring capacity. Dorgu's first appearance aired on 30 December.

On 1 January 2016, she appeared in David Walliams' TV adaptation of Billionaire Boy.

Soapstar Superstar
In January 2007, Dorgu was a contestant on UK reality programme Soapstar Superstar. The show, hosted by Zoë Ball, placed Dorgu up against ten other soap opera actors. Each night, they had to sing a different song with only 24 hours to learn it. Dorgu survived the bottom two for five nights and then finally went out after making it to the semi-finals.

Filmography

Theatre

References

External links

1977 births
English television actresses
English stage actresses
English people of Irish descent
English people of Nigerian descent
Living people
Black British actresses
Actors from Preston, Lancashire
People educated at Kirkham Grammar School
English soap opera actresses
Actresses from Manchester